A water balloon or water bomb is a balloon, often made of latex rubber, filled with water. Water balloons are used in a summer pastime of cooling off through water balloon fights. Water balloons are also popular for celebrations, including celebrating Holi and Carnival in India, Nepal, and several other countries.

Types

Water balloons are common in sizes from  though larger sizes are available.  Typically water balloons are sold in quantity and often include a filling nozzle in the packaging.  Many of the low cost brands use small water balloons and generic nozzles which both tend to be difficult to use.

Another form of water bomb is a sheet of paper folded to form a container capable of holding water.  These are then filled and used in a similar way to latex versions.

Gas balloons (air or helium types) may be used as water balloons, but are not typically preferred because the balloon wall thickness is different. A water balloon is designed to be filled up to the approximate size of a baseball in a pear shape (so as to be thrown more easily), whereas some gas balloons, when filled with water, may reach the size of a basketball; this is disadvantageous because those balloons are harder to handle, usually requiring two hands. Mainly for safety reasons, water balloon walls are designed to be thick enough to be held without bursting yet thin enough to burst upon impact.

In a similar process to gas balloons, water balloons may be molded into various shapes at manufacturing.  One process involves a patented mandrel for making elastomeric articles.

Filling and tying devices

Water balloons are typically filled at an indoor faucet, an outside tap, or at the end of a garden hose. Multiple types of filling nozzles are available on the consumer market and come in threaded ( standard in the U.S.) and non-threaded types. Non-threaded nozzles are called filling funnels and may be difficult to use. Some brands of nozzles are called loader instead of nozzle, but no differentiation exists between other types of nozzles. Nozzles may include a valve feature for turning the water source on or off as needed.

Homemade water balloon filling stations may incorporate water balloon nozzles or valves that are on the market or use common plumbing fixtures. These stations may have one or more nozzles or valves. Portable and fixed station designs each have distinct pros and cons depending on the location of use, number of system users, and the quantity of filled water balloons needed. Multi-nozzle stations not only enable more water balloons to be filled for adults planning upcoming youth events or for preventing boredom in children upset with how challenging it may be to fill a balloon at a hose spigot, but greatly enhance group social interactions which is very important in toys for children and adult volunteers that work with children.

Multiple toy companies have created balloon tying and filling devices, enabling the user to easily fill and tie water balloons.

Environmental impact 

Water balloons, like air balloons, are generally made from latex, which naturally decomposes. While there still could be some environmental impact if burst water balloons are left behind in the wild where animals might ingest them, that impact would be low. However, some air balloons are made from mylar, which does not decompose (or only extremely slowly). If mylar balloons are used as water bombs, then littering or leaving behind mylar balloons will have a much bigger environmental impact.

Yo-yo balloon

Yo-yo balloons, also known as Yo-yo Tsuris, are a common type of water balloon found at matsuri festivals in Japan. The balloon is clipped or tied closed and hung from an elastic string with a finger loop tied at the end. This gives them enough weight and bounce to function as a yo-yo, earning them their name. The balloons are often won in a game (Yo-yo Tsuri or just yo-yo) where they are set floating in a tub of water. Players "fish" for the balloons with a hook  at the end of a twisted paper string. As the wet paper line breaks easily, the game is often likened to goldfish scooping in terms of difficulty.

The Wii video game Ennichi no Tatsujin includes a virtual Yo-yo Tsuri game.

World record 
Guinness World Records maintains a record category for largest water balloon fight. The current holder is the University of Kentucky Christian Student Fellowship, a campus ministry of the Christian churches and churches of Christ.

Gallery

See also

 List of inflatable manufactured goods

References

Toy weapons
Balloons (entertainment)
Projectiles
Water Balloon
Inflatable manufactured goods
Articles containing video clips